The playoff round of the 2016 IIHF World Championship was held from 19 to 22 May 2016. The top four of each preliminary group qualified for the playoff round.

Qualified teams

Bracket

All times are local (UTC+3).

Quarterfinals

Semifinals

Bronze medal game

Gold medal game

References

External links
Official website

P